Sankt Nikolai may refer to the following municipalities in Styria, Austria:

 Sankt Nikolai im Sausal
 Sankt Nikolai im Sölktal 
 Sankt Nikolai ob Draßling 

or

 the Russian frigate Sankt Nikolai